Merton College Boat Club (MCBC) is a rowing club for members of Merton College, Oxford. It was established in 1838 and competes every year in Torpids and Summer Eights, the intercollegiate bumps races at the University of Oxford, as well as external regattas.

The club shares a boat house with Worcester College Boat Club on Boathouse Island, on the northern bank of the Isis.

The Club
Merton College Boat Club is run by a junior committee of current students at Merton who are guided by a Senior Member who is a current fellow of Merton. The committee reports to The Friends of Merton College Boat Club, a group of ex-rowers and alumni helping and supporting the boat club. Old members race every now and then on an ad-hoc basis as Merton Gannets, an alumni boat club that was founded in the 1950s.

According to the Club archives, the boathouse, which is still in use today, was finished in 1949 and is the last in the row of college boathouses built in the distinctive brick style mirroring the first boathouse built on the Isis stretch by Christ Church College in the 1920s. Currently plans are under way to extend the boathouse and funds are being raised for the project.

According to the archives, Merton competed successfully at Henley, winning at least two events, namely the Visitor's Challenge Cup, for coxless fours at the time, in 1920 and 1956. Additionally, Merton reached the final in the Ladies Challenge Plate in 1920. One member, Mr J L Bland, rowed in the Grand Challenge Cup winning OUBC/Thames Tradesmen's Rowing Club crew of 1981.

Recent years
Merton College Boat Club has fielded numerous ‘Blues’. Between 2005 and 2014 Merton produced more female crew members representing the university than any other college. Members of the club have also taken on the presidency of both the Oxford University Lightweight Rowing Club and the Oxford University Women's Lightweight Rowing Club multiple times.

Honours

Henley Royal Regatta

References

External links
Merton College Boat Club website
Oxford Torpids and Summer Eights bumps charts

1838 establishments in England
Sports clubs established in 1838
Rowing clubs of the University of Oxford
Boat Club
Rowing clubs in Oxfordshire
Rowing clubs of the River Thames